= 1931 Liechtenstein unemployment insurance referendum =

- 22 November 1931
- Referendum on the law on unemployment insurance

Results
Choice	Votes	%
Yes	653	36.18%
No	1,152	63.82%
Valid votes	1,805	89.44%
Invalid or blank votes	213	10.56%
Total votes	2,018	100.00%
Registered voters/turnout	2,376	84.93%

A referendum on the law on unemployment insurance was held in Liechtenstein on 22 November 1931. The proposal was rejected by 63.8% of voters.

== Results ==
Choice	Votes	%
For	653	36.2
Against	1,152	63.8
Invalid/blank votes	213	–
Total	2,018	100
Registered voters/turnout	2,376	84.9
Source: Nohlen & Stöver
